The Marion Forks Guard Station in Willamette National Forest was built in 1935.  It was listed on the National Register of Historic Places in 1991.

References

Buildings and structures completed in 1935
National Register of Historic Places in Linn County, Oregon
Buildings and structures in Linn County, Oregon
Civilian Conservation Corps in Oregon
1935 establishments in Oregon